Taylor William Pyatt (born August 19, 1981) is a Canadian former professional ice hockey player who played in the National Hockey League (NHL) for the New York Islanders, Buffalo Sabres, Vancouver Canucks, Phoenix Coyotes, New York Rangers and Pittsburgh Penguins. Drafted from the Ontario Hockey League (OHL), he played major junior hockey with the Sudbury Wolves.

Playing career

Early career
Pyatt played three seasons with the Sudbury Wolves of the Ontario Hockey League (OHL).  After scoring 75 points in 68 games in his second OHL season, Pyatt was selected eighth overall in the 1999 NHL Entry Draft by the New York Islanders. The next season, his third and final with Sudbury, Pyatt scored 89 points in 68 games, earning OHL First All-Star Team honours.

New York Islanders and Buffalo Sabres
In 2000–01, Pyatt made the final cut out of the Islanders' training camp as the only player with no prior NHL experience. On November 27, 2000, he scored his first NHL goal, against the Tampa Bay Lightning. After Pyatt's rookie season, during which he scored 18 points in 78 games, the Islanders traded him to the Buffalo Sabres (along with Tim Connolly) in exchange for Frank J. Selke Trophy winner Michael Peca in a draft-day trade.

During the 2004–05 lockout, Pyatt went overseas to play for Hammarby IF of the Swedish HockeyAllsvenskan.

Vancouver Canucks
After four seasons with Buffalo, on July 14, 2006, Pyatt was traded to the Vancouver Canucks in exchange for a fourth-round draft pick in the 2007 NHL Entry Draft (later traded by Buffalo to the Calgary Flames). Pyatt benefitted from playing on the Canucks' top line with twins Henrik and Daniel Sedin, leading to career highs in goals and points, with 23 and 37 respectively.

During the 2007–08 season, on January 13, 2008, Pyatt took a stick to the face. Getting in the way of an Eric Brewer clearing attempt in a game against the St. Louis Blues, he required 25 stitches in his upper lip and a splint in his mouth to hold up his teeth. He wore a full face shield upon his return to the lineup and elected to wear a visor for the remainder of his Vancouver tenure. Despite being taken off the Canucks' top line with the Sedins during the season, Pyatt completed the campaign matching his career-high of 37 points, as well as setting a new career mark for assists with 21. The next season, in 2008–09, Pyatt was sidelined for eight games due to a foot injury suffered on December 17, 2008. Following an injury to Pavol Demitra during the 2009 playoffs, Pyatt made his return to the lineup on May 5 for Game 3 of the second round against the Chicago Blackhawks. Following the Canucks' second round elimination, it was revealed Pyatt required off-season surgery to his knee.

Phoenix Coyotes
After not being re-signed by the Canucks, Pyatt became an unrestricted free agent on July 1, 2009. Two months later, he signed a one-year, $600,000 contract with the Phoenix Coyotes. Going into his first season with the Coyotes, Pyatt suffered a lower body injury during training camp and missed the team's first five regular season games. One month after returning to the Coyotes' lineup, he and younger brother Tom Pyatt of the Montreal Canadiens played against each other for the first time in their careers. On December 23, 2009, as the Coyotes played their final game before the NHL Christmas break against the Anaheim Ducks, Pyatt scored the second goal of the game, his 200th career NHL point. Near the end of the regular season, Pyatt recorded a Gordie Howe hat trick against the Colorado Avalanche after scoring a goal, recording an assist and engaging in a fight. The Coyotes defeated the Avalanche 6–2 and clinched their first playoff berth in seven seasons. Pyatt finished the regular season with 12 goals and 23 points in 74 games played. In the playoffs, he scored one goal and recorded one assist as the Coyotes were eliminated in the Western Conference Quarterfinals by the Detroit Red Wings in seven games.

On June 21, 2010, Pyatt signed a two-year, $2 million contract extension with Phoenix, avoiding unrestricted free agency. In his second season with the Coyotes, Pyatt began scoring more frequently than in his previous season. However, on December 20, 2010, in a 6–1 loss to the Pittsburgh Penguins, Pyatt suffered an upper body injury during a fight with Penguins enforcer Deryk Engelland and was subsequently placed on the Coyotes' injured reserve list. After missing four games, he returned to the lineup for the Coyotes' New Year's Eve game against the St. Louis Blues.

New York Rangers and Pittsburgh Penguins
On July 3, 2012, Pyatt signed with the New York Rangers on a two-year, $3.1 million contract. In the final year of his contract with the Rangers on January 2, 2014, Pyatt was claimed off of waivers by the Pittsburgh Penguins. He scored his first goal with the Penguins on January 15, 2014, against the Washington Capitals. He would add three more goals during the remainder of the season. He did not play in the 2014 playoffs.

Switzerland and retirement
On July 24, 2014, with indication of little NHL interest, Pyatt agreed to a one-year free agent contract with Swiss team Genève-Servette HC of the National League A. For the first time in his career, Pyatt played alongside brother Tom Pyatt with Genève-Servette.

After one season in Switzerland, his 15th professional season, Pyatt retired from professional hockey.

Personal life
Pyatt is one of three sons of Kathie and former NHL player Nelson Pyatt. His younger brother by six years, Tom Pyatt, was also a professional ice hockey player.

Career statistics

Awards and achievements

Junior

NHL

Transactions
June 26, 1999 – Drafted in the first round, eighth overall by the New York Islanders in the 1999 NHL Entry Draft.
June 24, 2001 – Traded by the New York Islanders with Tim Connolly to the Buffalo Sabres for Michael Peca.
July 14, 2006 – Traded by the Buffalo Sabres to the Vancouver Canucks for the Canucks' fourth round selection (later traded to the Calgary Flames — Keith Aulie) in the 2007 NHL Entry Draft.
September 2, 2009 – Signed as an unrestricted free agent by the Phoenix Coyotes.
July 3, 2012 – Signed as an unrestricted free agent by the New York Rangers.
January 2, 2014 – Claimed off of waivers by the Pittsburgh Penguins.

References

External links

1981 births
Living people
Buffalo Sabres players
Canadian ice hockey left wingers
Genève-Servette HC players
Hammarby Hockey (1921–2008) players
Ice hockey people from Ontario
Sportspeople from Thunder Bay
National Hockey League first-round draft picks
New York Islanders draft picks
New York Islanders players
New York Rangers players
Phoenix Coyotes players
Pittsburgh Penguins players
Rochester Americans players
Sudbury Wolves players
Vancouver Canucks players
Canadian expatriate ice hockey players in Switzerland
Canadian expatriate ice hockey players in Sweden